The Battle of Ixtlahuaca, an episode of the Mexican Reform War, took place on September 18, 1858 in the municipality of Ixtlahuaca in the State of Mexico, between liberal and conservative army forces. The victory was won by the liberal side.

The liberal brigadier, Manuel Garcia Pueblita, then commander of the division of Michoacán was near San Felipe del Progreso, was notified by when military information that a conservative force was garrisoned in the town of Ixtlahuaca. He quickly led his troops to that town, arriving on 18 September 1858 at 10:00 hours. The battle ended at about 13:30 hours. Pueblita achieved victory and won the square. He retired to Tepetitlán with the Treasury, yielding the town to Benito Juárez.

References

1858 in Mexico
Conflicts in 1858
September 1858 events
Reform War